Alex Namazaba (born 5 May 1973) is a Zambian footballer. He played in 13 matches for the Zambia national football team from 1995 to 1999. He was also named in Zambia's squad for the 1996 African Cup of Nations tournament.

References

1973 births
Living people
Zambian footballers
Zambia international footballers
1996 African Cup of Nations players
Place of birth missing (living people)
Association football midfielders